The Regional Second Division is an association of 14 regional football leagues which together comprise the third-tier of football in Namibia. It operates under the auspices of the Namibia Football Association.

Organization 
Each of the 14 regions of Namibia operates its own Regional Second Division league. In 2019 a FIFA Normalisation Committee worked with the regional associations to meet requirements to be in compliance as members of the NFA.

Promotion 
The winners of each regional league enters a play-off competition to determine promotion to the First Division.

References 

Namibia